Ardit Peposhi (born 14 September 1993) is an Albanian professional footballer who plays as a midfielder for Bylis Ballsh in the Albanian Superliga.

Club career

Partizani Tirana
Peposhi is a product of his capital club Partizani Tirana, where he began his career professionally in 2010 when Partizani Tirana were struggling in the Albanian First Division. His debut season was not successful as it saw his side relegated to the 3rd tier of Albanian football.

Tirana
He left the club in the summer of 2011 and joined city rivals KF Tirana in the top flight. As competition for places was fierce at the time, Peposhi found it hard to play feature and was limited to only substitute appearances and cup games.

Bylis Ballsh
On 16 July 2015, Peposhi signed a two-year deal contract with the nearly promoted side Bylis Ballsh, with an option to renew it for another year. He made his league debut for the club on 23 August 2015 in a 2–0 away loss to FK Kukësi. He played all ninety minutes of the match. He scored his first league goal for the club on 17 October 2015 in a 2–1 away loss to Partizani Tirana. His goal, scored in the seventh minute, made the score 1-0 to Bylis. In the 91st minute, Peposhi was shown a straight red card.

Kukësi
On 14 August 2017, Peposhi signed with his hometown club Kukësi by agreeing a one-year contract with an option of a further one. He was presented alongside Rauf Aliyev, stating: "I'm very happy to be part of my hometown team." He made his league debut for the club on 25 November 2017 in a 1–0 away victory over KF Laçi. He was subbed on for Rauf Aliyev in the 72nd minute.

Career statistics

Honours
Tirana

Albanian Cup: 2011–12
Albanian Supercup: 2012

References

External links
Profile at Football Database

Profile at FSHF.org

1993 births
Living people
People from Kukës
Association football midfielders
Albanian footballers
Albania youth international footballers
FK Partizani Tirana players
KF Tirana players
KF Teuta Durrës players
KF Bylis Ballsh players
KF Korabi Peshkopi players
FK Kukësi players
Kategoria e Parë players
Kategoria Superiore players